These are the international rankings of Sweden.

Economy

International Monetary Fund: Income per capita in purchasing power parity ranked  17 out of 187 (2014)
United Nations Development Programme:  Human Development Index ranked 12 out of 187 (2014)
 Gallup World Poll: happiness   ranked 4 out of 155 (2009)
World Economic Forum: Global Competitiveness Report ranked 10 out of 144 (2014-2015)

Military

Institute for Economics and Peace: Global Peace Index ranked 10 out of 144 (2010)

Politics

Transparency International: Corruption Perceptions Index ranked 4 out of 180 (2010)
Reporters Without Borders: Press Freedom Index ranked 1 out of 178 (2010)
The Economist:  Democracy Index ranked  4 out of 167 (2010)

Sweden